The Astoria Riverfront Trolley is a  heritage streetcar line that operates in Astoria, Oregon, United States, using former freight railroad tracks along or near the south bank of the Columbia River, with no overhead line.  The service began operating in 1999, using a 1913-built streetcar from San Antonio, Texas. As of 2012, the service was reported as carrying 35,000 to 40,000 passengers per year and has been called a "symbol" and "icon" of Astoria.  The line's operation is seasonal, normally during spring break and from May through September.

Volunteers from the non-profit Astoria Riverfront Trolley Association (ARTA) operate the service and maintain the streetcar and tracks, but the city of Astoria has provided some funds for certain purchases, including a new carbarn in 2001 and a contribution to the cost of purchasing the streetcar.  The car was on loan from San Antonio for the first seven years, but was purchased by ARTA in August 2005.  By 2004, the Trolley had become "one of Astoria's most popular features" and "a main attraction in the city of Astoria".

Pre-opening history
The idea of creating a heritage streetcar system in Astoria, as part of efforts to redevelop and revitalize the riverfront area, had first been raised in 1980, long after the closure of the city's streetcar-transit system, which operated from 1892 to 1924. An attempt by city officials to acquire a trolley car in 1986 was dropped in the face of high insurance costs.

The remaining  section of the Portland–Astoria line was sold by BN to the Portland and Western Railroad in 1997 and kept intact. After Astoria officials learned that a genuine vintage streetcar already in Oregon was not in use and was available for possible lease, they approached its owners and negotiated a five-year lease. The car was ex-San Antonio Public Service Company No. 300 and was owned by the San Antonio Museum of Art, but had been in Oregon since 1990 and had been used on the Willamette Shore Trolley line, in Portland, from 1990 through 1994. In November 1998, Astoria mayor Willis Van Dusen signed the five-year lease, which specified a rent of just $1 per year, and car 300 was moved to Astoria the following month. Since 1995, it had been stored in a closed museum near Gales Creek, Oregon, known as the Trolley Park (and formally as the Oregon Electric Railway Museum until that museum moved in 1996). Although the car had been in regular use until fewer than four years earlier, it had been stored outdoors since that time and was now in need of extensive restoration work.

After raising $40,000 in donations, volunteers refurbished car 300 and repainted it from the yellow paint scheme it had worn in Portland (inherited from San Antonio) to a new red-and-green livery, with "Astoria Riverfront Trolley" lettered along the side, above the windows.  To avoid the expense of installing trolley wire and associated support poles and electrical substations, the electric motors of the trolley are powered by a diesel generator mounted on a trailer that the car pulls when westbound and pushes when eastbound, the same arrangement that car 300 had used when running on the Willamette Shore Trolley.

Route and service
Service was inaugurated on June 8, 1999, on a  route from Portway Street to 36th Street. The principal boarding location was at the Columbia River Maritime Museum (at 17th Street and approximately the middle of the route), and initially there were no other set stops. Several designated stops were added later, and some of these include a bench and small shelter. Passengers are still permitted to flag-down the trolley in between the posted stops.

The route runs parallel to the Columbia River's bank, and the river is visible most of the way. In a few places, the tracks are carried on low trestles over the water. The line passes through the National Register of Historic Places-listed Downtown Historic District, and its westernmost section passes under the Astoria–Megler Bridge. To the east of the Maritime Museum, at 20th Street, it passes a former Spokane, Portland and Seattle Railway depot built in 1924. The fare has always been $1, with an all-day pass available for $2.

During the first few years, the line operated from March or April through December, daily in summer months and otherwise Fridays through Sundays.  Since about 2005, it has typically run daily from May through September, and sometimes also during spring break. Hours of operation are noon to 7 p.m. daily, Memorial Day to Labor Day, with more limited dates and hours in late spring and early fall. A round trip takes about 50 minutes. The car makes a trip approximately once an hour in each direction, but there is no exact schedule. Volunteers from the trolley association operate the car, with a two-person crew consisting of a motorman and a conductor. Boarding takes place at the rear door, where the conductor assists people in boarding, collects fares and identifies sights along the route while talking about the city's history.

The trolley line has been credited by local officials with being instrumental in bringing about redevelopment of the downtown waterfront area, among them the chairman of the Port of Astoria Commission, the executive director of the chamber of commerce and the chairman of the Clatsop County Commission. Mayor Willis Van Dusen, another of the trolley's supporters, was quoted in a 2004 Daily Astorian article as saying that the trolley "has become almost a logo for the city, second only to the Astoria Column."

Because of the COVID-19 pandemic, all service was suspended in 2020. As of early July 2021, the line was scheduled to reopen for service on July 23.

Facilities and acquisitions
Benches and shelters were installed at several stops along the line in 2000 and 2001.  In 2002, a new carbarn was built on Industry Street, at the line's west end, where the trolley car is stored and maintained.  The  building is owned by the city of Astoria.  In 2004, the Sunset Empire Transportation District opened a new bus transit center near the trolley line, at Ninth Avenue and Marine Drive.

In 2005, the San Antonio Museum of Art (SAMA), which had previously been unwilling to sell car 300, agreed to allow the Astoria Riverfront Trolley Association (ARTA) to buy it.  The price was $50,000, and it was paid for almost entirely with donations, but with the city of Astoria contributing $5,000. The purchase was completed in early 2006.

In 2010, the car was fitted with a GPS tracking device, and the Astoria-Warrenton Chamber of Commerce makes location information available to the public on its website. The data is updated online every two minutes while the trolley is running.

Car 300 history

ARTA's only streetcar is No. 300, nicknamed "Old 300" and built in 1913 by the American Car Company for the streetcar system in San Antonio, Texas.  It served San Antonio until the abandonment of streetcar service there in 1933 and was acquired at that time by the San Antonio Museum Association, former parent of the San Antonio Museum of Art.  In 1981, SAMA opened in a former Lone Star Brewery building located along the tracks of the Texas Transportation Company.  As an additional attraction for museum visitors, car 300 was restored to operating condition, and in October 1982 it began providing public rides along a short section of track behind the art museum.  This heritage trolley service was discontinued at the end of 1985 due to budget cuts, and the trolley car, by then already nicknamed "Old Number 300", went back into storage.

No. 300 was brought to Oregon in June 1990 by Gales Creek Enterprises (GCE), the then-new operator of the Willamette Shore Trolley line in Portland. GCE was leasing the car from the San Antonio Museum Association.  Car 300 was the main streetcar on the WST line through the 1994 season, but in 1995 the city of Lake Oswego decided to give the operating contract for the WST instead to the Oregon Electric Railway Historical Society, and that group substituted its own historic streetcars to provide WST service.  GCE moved car 300 to storage at the Oregon Electric Railway Museum, located near Glenwood (and Gales Creek) at that time. Meanwhile, the San Antonio Museum Association was dissolved in 1994, and the San Antonio Museum of Art became car 300's owner.

In 1998, Astoria officials learned of the car's availability and secured a five-year lease agreement with SAMA.  The car was brought to Astoria in December 1998 to be restored, and it inaugurated the Astoria Riverfront Trolley service in June 1999.  In 2003, the lease agreement was extended for another five years, but in 2005 this was superseded by an outright purchase, after SAMA agreed to sell the car to the Astoria Riverfront Trolley Association.

See also

List of heritage railroads in the United States

References

External links

  
 Streetcar City – half-hour video by Oregon Public Broadcasting including 2 minutes on Astoria trolley history and the Astoria Riverfront Trolley (starting at 14:53 minutes)
 Astoria streetcar system – The Oregon Encyclopedia page about the former streetcar system

1999 establishments in Oregon
Astoria, Oregon
Heritage railroads in Oregon
Heritage streetcar systems
Streetcars in Oregon
Transportation in Clatsop County, Oregon
Tourist attractions in Clatsop County, Oregon
Railway lines opened in 1999